Qu Feifei (born May 18, 1982 in Shenyang, Liaoning) is a Chinese football (soccer) player who competed at the 2004 Summer Olympics.

In 2004, she finished ninth with the Chinese team in the women's tournament. She played both matches.

External links
 Profile at Yahoo! Sports

1982 births
Living people
Chinese women's footballers
China women's international footballers
Footballers at the 2004 Summer Olympics
Olympic footballers of China
2003 FIFA Women's World Cup players
2007 FIFA Women's World Cup players
Footballers from Shenyang
Asian Games medalists in football
Footballers at the 2006 Asian Games
Asian Games bronze medalists for China
Women's association football midfielders
Medalists at the 2006 Asian Games